Shoaymit-e Jaber (also Romanized as Shoʿaymiṭ-e Jāber; also known as Shoeymet Jāber) is a village in Mosharrahat Rural District, in the Central District of Ahvaz County, Khuzestan Province, Iran. At the 2006 census, its population was 149, in 20 families.

References 

Populated places in Ahvaz County